Abdur Rahman (born 1 January 1950) is a Bangladesh Awami League politician and the incumbent member of parliament from Faridpur-1. He is a presidium member of the Bangladesh Awami League.

Early life
Rahman was born on 1 January 1950. He has a M.S.S. and L.L.B from the University of Dhaka. He was general secretary of the student political organization Bangladesh Chhatra League from 1986 to 1988.

Career
Rahman was elected to parliament in 2014 from Faridpur-1 as a Bangladesh Awami League candidate.

References

Further reading
 

Living people
1950 births
University of Dhaka alumni
Awami League politicians
9th Jatiya Sangsad members
10th Jatiya Sangsad members